Eleme is a local government area in Rivers State, Nigeria. It is part of the Port Harcourt metropolitan city. It covers an area of 138 km2 and at the 2006 Census had a population of 190,884.  The Eleme people are Eleme's main indigenous ethnic group.

The Eleme language, of the Cross-River branch of the larger Niger-Congo language family, is the main spoken language.

Eleme has two of Nigeria's four, as of 2005, petroleum refineries and one of Nigeria's busiest seaport and the largest seaport in West Africa located at Onne, a famous town with numerous industries.

References

External links

Local Government Areas in Rivers State
Geography of Port Harcourt
1996 establishments in Nigeria
1990s establishments in Rivers State